Richard Godfrey Parsons (1882–1948) was an Anglican bishop who served in three dioceses during the first half of the 20th century, and a renowned liberal scholar.

Parsonshe was born into a Lancashire family  on 12 November 1882 and educated at Durham School and Magdalen College, Oxford. Ordained priest in 1907 he was a curate at Hampstead before four years as Chaplain at University College, Oxford. and Principal of Wells Theological College from 1911-16. He served for one year as a Temporary Chaplain to the Forces. Married with two children, he expressed a preference to remain 'at home' and he was posted to '2 General Hospital, London'. He was described as 'Roundfaced'.

(Ideally suited to pastoral work, he became Bishop of Middleton, a suffragan bishop appointment, in 1927. During this period he was one of several clerics who made a major contribution to the revision of the Book of Common Prayer. A man with much sympathy to the poor he enjoyed his time at the Diocese of Southwark (1932–41) before translation to Hereford; he legally took the See of Hereford at the confirmation of his election on 12 November 1941 at St Margaret's, Westminster. A devoted family man, he married Dorothy Streeter in 1912. His son died in the siege of Tobruk and he died himself on 26 December 1948.

References

1882 births
People educated at Durham School
Alumni of Magdalen College, Oxford
Fellows of University College, Oxford
Bishops of Middleton
Bishops of Hereford
20th-century Church of England bishops
1948 deaths